The Six Dales Trail is a long distance footpath in North Yorkshire, England, with a short section in West Yorkshire.

The trail is waymarked.  It was opened by Janet Street-Porter at the end of June 2010 in conjunction with Otley Walking Festival. It is a project of Walkers are Welcome - Otley.

Route 
The route takes its name from the six Yorkshire Dales it traverses: Wharfedale, Washburndale, Nidderdale, Colsterdale, Coverdale and Wensleydale.

From Otley in Wharfedale the trail heads north to Swinsty Reservoir, then follows Washburndale past Fewston Reservoir to the small village of Blubberhouses.  From the dam of Thruscross Reservoir above Blubberhouses the trail climbs and descends to the village of Glasshouses in Nidderdale.  It says close to the River Nidd to Pateley Bridge.  Above Pateley the trail coincides with the Nidderdale Way past Wath and Gouthwaite Reservoir to Bouthwaite near Ramsgill.  The trail then ascends to cross Fountains Earth Moor and Low Ash Head Moor to the head of Roundhill Reservoir.  It descends to cross Colsterdale at Gollinglith Foot to reach Ellingstring and Jervaulx Abbey in Wensleydale.  It then ascends the side valley of Coverdale for  before turning north to reach the end of the trail at Middleham.

References

External links 

 Walkers are Welcome - Otley Homepage
 Six Dales Trail
 Long Distance Walkers' Association
 Nidderdale AONB

Footpaths in North Yorkshire
Footpaths in West Yorkshire
Long-distance footpaths in England
Yorkshire Dales